Tim Murphy (born 1953 in Blackrock, County Cork) is a former Irish hurling manager and former player. He played hurling with his local club Blackrock and succeeded Martin Coleman as goalkeeper on the Cork senior inter-county team for one season in 1980.  He was subsequently replaced by Ger Cunningham.

Murphy later served as coach of the Blackrock senior hurling team.

References

1952 births
Living people
Blackrock National Hurling Club hurlers
Cork inter-county hurlers
Hurling goalkeepers
Hurling managers